NASA Astronaut Group 7 was a group of seven astronauts accepted by the National Aeronautics and Space Administration (NASA) on August 14, 1969. It was the last group to be selected during the Project Apollo era, and the first since the Mercury Seven in which all members were active-duty military personnel, and all made flights into space.

The Manned Orbiting Laboratory (MOL) was a semi-secret United States Air Force (USAF) space project, with a public face but a covert reconnaissance mission. Seventeen astronauts were selected for the program in three intakes in 1965, 1966 and 1967. They were drawn from the USAF, US Navy and US Marine Corps, but all were graduates of the USAF Aerospace Research Pilot School. The MOL program intended to use a modified NASA Project Gemini spacecraft known as Gemini B.

When the MOL program was canceled in June 1969, fourteen astronauts remained in the program. NASA accepted the seven youngest as NASA astronauts. By the time they joined NASA, all Apollo flight assignments had been lined up, but they were given non-flying support assignments for Apollo, Skylab and the Apollo-Soyuz Test Project. The former MOL astronauts went on to form the core of early Space Shuttle pilots, upgrading to commander after their first flight, and flying 17 missions between them.

Background 

On August 25, 1962, the United States Air Force began studies of a manned spy satellite, which became the Manned Orbiting Laboratory (MOL). President Lyndon Johnson announced the MOL Program on August 25, 1965. Military astronauts would use the Gemini B spacecraft. MOL was a semi-secret project, with public experiments but a covert reconnaissance mission.

Selection 

The selection criteria for MOL astronauts was:
 Qualified military pilots;
 Graduates of the Aerospace Research Pilot School (ARPS);
 Serving officers, recommended by their commanding officers; and
 Holding US citizenship from birth.

No call for volunteers was issued for the first group; fifteen candidates, all ARPS graduates, were selected for a week of medical evaluation in October 1964. The evaluations were similar to those conducted for the NASA astronaut groups. The names of the first group of eight MOL astronauts were publicly announced on November 12, 1965. Five more were announced on June 17, 1966, and four more on June 30, 1967.

Transfer to NASA 
On June 10, 1969, the MOL Project was canceled. Fourteen of its seventeen astronauts were still with the program; John L. Finley had returned to the Navy, Michael J. Adams transferred to the X-15, and Robert H. Lawrence died during training. Many had hoped since childhood to travel to space. The program asked NASA if it could use MOL resources, including astronauts. All of the 14 except Robert T. Herres wanted to transfer.

Director of Flight Crew Operations Deke Slayton told the MOL group that he did not need more astronauts for a diminishing number of Apollo and Apollo Applications Program flights. Manned Spacecraft Center director Robert R. Gilruth agreed, but Deputy Administrator of NASA George Mueller thought that sooner or later the agency would need help from the USAF, and maintaining good relations was good policy. Slayton and Gilruth agreed to take those who met its age limit of 36. Seven of the thirteen were 35 or younger. NASA also took Albert H. Crews as a test pilot. NASA's acceptance of the seven MOL astronauts was announced on August 14, 1969.

Group members

Operations 

The seven NASA transfers under the age limit did not go through a selection process. Some immediately started working for the agency, and others in 1970 after a year of further education. They had not trained for specific MOL missions but had received useful generic training, including jungle and water survival and Scuba school, and helped develop MOL systems. While Slayton warned the MOL transfers that they would probably not fly until the space shuttle around 1980, he did have many duties for them. The first step was selection to a mission support crew. Fullerton served on the support crews for the Apollo 14 and 17 lunar landing missions, Hartsfield and Peterson on that of Apollo 16, and Overmyer on that of Apollo 17, and they performed CAPCOM duties on those missions. Fullerton was also CAPCOM on Apollo 15 and 16. Crippen, Hartsfield and Truly served on the support crews for the Skylab missions,  and Bobko, Crippen, Overmyer and Truly served on that of the Apollo-Soyuz Test Project.

In each case, one of the MOL astronauts was paired with one of the members of NASA Astronaut Group 5 who had flown in space. The commander of the first crew was Fred Haise, with Fullerton as pilot, and the second was commanded by Joe Engle, with Truly as pilot. By this time, only 31 of the 73 pilot and scientist astronauts selected between 1959 and 1969 remained with NASA, and they would soon be outnumbered by the 35 newcomers selected in 1978.

All seven MOL astronauts flew on the Space Shuttle, starting with Crippen on STS-1, the very first mission, in April 1981. The pattern of a senior astronaut flying as command with a member of the seven MOL astronauts as pilot was followed for the first six shuttle missions, after which all members of the group had flown. Although they had trained for Gemini spacecraft in which they would work in pairs, the April 1983 STS-6 mission was the only one in which two of them flew on the same mission. Peterson's extravehicular activity on that mission, the first in the Space Shuttle program, was the only one conducted by a member of the group. All the others would fly at least one more mission, as the mission commander, before they retired. Hartsfield commanded the last mission flown by a member of the group, STS-61A, in October and November 1985. The group flew 17 missions in total.

Notes

References

External links 
Astronaut Biographies: Home Page

NASA Astronaut Corps
Lists of astronauts